Holy Spirit National High School (HSNHS) is a public high school located in Barangay Holy Spirit in Quezon City, Philippines. It was founded on 2003 as Commonwealth High School Holy Spirit Annex, the annex school of Commonwealth High School in Barangay Commonwealth, Quezon City. In 2008, it was renamed as Holy Spirit National High School after getting its independence.

History

Holy Spirit National High School was created because of the need to provide quality and accessible education to students of Barangay Holy Spirit. To deal with the rise of enrollees in Commonwealth High School, the local government came up with the proposal of putting up an annex in the said barangay.

The first batch of graduates was headed by Bryan Lloyd dela Rosa, class of 2006 valedictorian. Admitted to the University of the Philippines Los Baños (Applied Mathematics), and San Beda College of Law (Bachelor of Laws).

External links
Official site
Student's Handbook (Revised Edition 2017)

Educational institutions established in 2003
Schools in Quezon City
High schools in Metro Manila
2003 establishments in the Philippines